"A Touch of Glass" is an episode of the BBC sitcom, Only Fools and Horses, first screened on 2 December 1982 as the final episode of series 2. It was the first episode of the show to attract over 10 million viewers.

In the episode, the Trotters are hired to clean some priceless chandeliers in a country mansion. The scene when they accidentally smash one of the chandeliers came second in a Gold poll to find the best Only Fools and Horses moment.

Synopsis
While on a trip to Dorset to buy a consignment of musical China cats which play the song "How much is that doggie in the window?", Del Boy, Rodney and Grandad stop to help a woman whose car has broken down. The woman turns out to be a member of the aristocracy, Lady Ridgemere. They tow her home and are reluctantly invited in by the arrogant Lord Ridgemere.

The Trotters quickly offend the residents at the mansion. Whilst there, Del overhears Lord Ridgemere haggling with someone on the telephone about the cost of cleaning their two priceless Louis XIV chandeliers. Seeking opportunity, Del tricks the Lord into believing that chandeliers are the Trotters' family business and agrees to carry out the necessary work at a low price.

The Trotters return to the mansion a week later to clean the chandeliers, though the Lord and Lady are on holiday. Grandad goes upstairs to unscrew the holding bolt for one of the chandeliers while Del and Rodney climb up on step ladders with a blanket ready to catch it. However, unbeknown to Del and Rodney (and the audience), Grandad is loosening the bolt for the adjacent chandelier. He knocks the bolt out, and as Del and Rodney are ready to catch their chandelier, the second chandelier plummets to the ground and smashes. After verifying with the butler that they never gave any of their contact details to the Ridgemeres, the Trotters flee from the mansion in their van.

Episode cast

Production
John Sullivan's father was the inspiration for the smashed chandelier storyline. Working as a plumber in the 1930s, he was part of a group of men who were fitting a new heating system into a stately home, and had to move some chandeliers. As with the Trotters, there was a mix up and the wrong one was undone and smashed. Sullivan found the story hilarious, although his father – who was sacked as a result of the incident – did not see the funny side. After watching the episode, however, he telephoned his son and agreed that it was funny after all. David Jason and Ray Butt agreed that the storyline ought to be used, meaning Sullivan had to write the script backwards, starting with just the end point and then working out how the Trotters would come to be in a mansion.

The smashed chandelier was made by props company Trading Post. Despite being a fake, it was still worth about £6,000 and only one was made, meaning the scene could only be filmed once. It was initially intended that this would be the final scene in the episode, so after the incident Jason and Lyndhurst were required to stand and stare at each other in silence for 30 seconds while the camera rolled. Lyndhurst later recalled that Butt threatened to sack him if he ruined the scene by laughing. Many of the cast and crew struggled to contain their laughter in the aftermath of the shot; Butt himself stuffed a handkerchief into his mouth and left the room.

Given the task of finding a suitable "Ridgemere Hall", production manager Janet Bone eventually settled on Clayesmore School, a boarding school in Iwerne Minster, Dorset. The school would not give permission for any of its floorboards to be pulled up, however, so the scene with Granddad undoing the fastening nut was filmed in a house belonging to Ray Butt's girlfriend. The auction house seen at the beginning of the episode is the village hall of Sutton Waldron, Dorset.

Reception
"A Touch of Glass" was the first episode of Only Fools and Horses to attract a UK television audience of over 10 million. Owing to the chandelier scene, it is one of the show's best known episodes. In December 2006, the scene came second in a UKTV Gold poll to find the Top 40 Only Fools Moments, second only to Del Boy falling through an open bar flap in the episode "Yuppy Love". It was also voted the best British comedy moment in a 2000 poll.

References

External links

1982 British television episodes
Only Fools and Horses (series 2) episodes